Shell cordovan or cordovan is a type of leather commonly used in high-end shoemaking. Cordovan is an equine leather made from the fibrous flat connective tissue (or shell) beneath the hide on the rump of the horse. The leather derives its name from the city of Cordoba, Spain, where it was first produced by the Visigoths in the seventh century, and later also by the Moors. It is a difficult and expensive leather to make, and in the late 19th and early 20th century was mostly used for razor strops to sharpen razors in barber shops.  More recently it has been increasingly used for shoes, wallets, and watch straps due to its aesthetic qualities and exceptional durability. It is also used in archery to protect the fingers. It is smooth and durable, ideal for a finger tab. Shell cordovan has a unique non-creasing characteristic. Because it is made of connective tissue, it is smooth and lacks the pebbled effect of leather derived from animal skin. 

Horween Leather Company, the oldest tannery in the United States, is known for its production of shell cordovan, was called the "Cordovan capital of the world" by the Chicago Tribune.

Production
After removal from the horse, the hide is measured from the root of the tail 18 inches forward on the backbone. The hide is cut at right angles to the backbone and the resulting pieces termed a "front" (the forward part) and the "butt". The term cordovan leather applies to the product of both the tanned fronts and tanned butts, but is especially used in connection with the term galoshes, meaning the vamps or boot-fronts cut from the shell of the butt.

After being tanned, leather from the "front" is typically used in the fabrication of gloves, or blackened, to be used in the tops of shoes. The "butt", after tanning, is passed through a splitting-machine which removes the grain, or hair side, revealing what is termed the "shell". The close fibers of the shell result in a smooth and pliable leather used mostly in the manufacture of shoes.  Other uses include watch straps and the manufacture of finger protection tabs for archerywhere it is prized for its toughness, longevity, and protective qualities.

References

External links
 Shell cordovan making

Leathermaking
Leather